The 68th annual Venice International Film Festival was held in Venice, Italy between 31 August and 10 September 2011. American film director Darren Aronofsky was announced as the Head of the Jury. American actor and film director Al Pacino was presented with the Glory to the Film-maker award on 4 September, prior to the premiere of his upcoming film Wilde Salomé. Marco Bellocchio was awarded with the Golden Lion for Lifetime Achievement in September. The festival opened with the American film The Ides of March, directed by George Clooney, and closed with Damsels in Distress by Whit Stillman.

Juries
The international juries of the 68th Venice International Film Festival were composed as follows:

Main competition (Venezia 68)
 Darren Aronofsky, American director, jury president
 Eija-Liisa Ahtila, Finnish visual artist and filmmaker
 David Byrne, British musician
 Todd Haynes, American director
 Mario Martone, Italian director
 Alba Rohrwacher, Italian actress
 André Téchiné, French director

Horizons (Orizzonti)
 Jia Zhangke, Chinese director, jury president
 Stuart Comer, British Curator of Film at Tate Modern
 Odile Decq, French architect
 Marianne Khoury, Egyptian director
 Jacopo Quadri, Italian film editor

Controcampo Italiano
 Stefano Incerti, Italian author, jury president
 Aureliano Amadei, Italian actor
 Cristiana Capotondi, Italian actress

Opera Prima (Venice Award for a Debut Film)
 Carlo Mazzacurati, Italian director, jury president
 Aleksei Fedorchenko, Russian director
 Fred Roos, American producer
 Charles Tesson, French Artistic Director of the International Critics' Week at the Cannes Film Festival
 Serra Yilmaz, Turkish actress

Official selection

In Competition
The following films were selected to compete for the Golden Lion:

Highlighted title indicates the Golden Lion winner.

Out of competition
The following films were shown out of competition:

Horizons
The following films were selected for the Horizons (Orizzonti) section:

Highlighted title indicates the Orizzonti Award for Best Feature Film winner.

Controcampo Italiano
The following films, representing "new trends in Italian cinema", were screened in this section:

In competition

Out of competition

Italian avant-garde retrospective
The following films were shown as part of a retrospective section on Italian avant-garde films, titled Orizzonti 1961-1978, spanning the years 1961 to 1978.

Autonomous sections

Venice International Film Critics' Week
The following films were screened for this section:

Venice Days
The following films were screened as part of the Venice Days section The three nominees for the European Parliament's 2011 Lux Prize received screenings as part of this section.

Awards

Official selection
The following Official selection awards were conferred at the festival:

In Competition (Venezia 68)
Golden Lion: Faust
Silver Lion for Best Director: Cai Shangjun, for People Mountain People Sea
Special Jury Prize: Terraferma by Emanuele Crialese
Volpi Cup for Best Actor: Michael Fassbender, for Shame
Volpi Cup for Best Actress: Deanie Ip, for A Simple Life
Marcello Mastroianni Award, for the best emerging actor or actress: Shōta Sometani and Fumi Nikaidō for Himizu
Osella for Best Cinematography: Robbie Ryan for Wuthering Heights 
Osella for Best Screenplay: Yorgos Lanthimos and Efthimis Filippou for Alps

Horizons (Orizzonti)
 Horizons Award: Kotoko by Shinya Tsukamoto (Japan)
 Special Horizons jury prize: Whores' Glory by Michael Glawogger (Austria, Germany)
 Horizons Award for medium-length film: Accidentes Gloriosos by Mauro Andrizzi and Marcus Lindeen (Sweden, Denmark, Germany)
 Horizons Award for short film: In attesa dell'avvento by Felice D'Agostino and Arturo Lavorato (Italy)
 Special mentions: 
O Le Tulafale (The Orator) by Tusi Tamasese (New Zealand, Samoa)
All The Lines Flow Out by Charles LIM Yi Yong (Singapore)

Controcampo Italiano
 Best Feature film:  Scialla! by Francesco Bruni
 Best Short film: A Chjàna by Jonas Carpignano
 Best Documentary: Pugni chiusi by Fiorella Infascelli
 Special Mentions: 
Black Block (documentary) by Carlo Augusto Bachschmidt
 Franco Di Giacomo (cinematography) for Pugni chiusi

Special awards
 Golden Lion for Lifetime Achievement: Marco Bellocchio
 Jaeger-LeCoultre Glory to the Filmmaker Award: Al Pacino
 Persol 3D Award for the Most Creative Stereoscopic Film: Zapruder Filmmakers Group (David Zamagni, Nadia Ranocchi & Monaldo Moretti)
 L'Oréal Paris Award for Cinema: Nicole Grimaudo

Autonomous sections
The following official and collateral awards were conferred to films of the autonomous sections:

Venice International Film Critics' Week
Lion of the Future
"Luigi de Laurentis" Award for a Debut Film: Là-bas by Guido Lombardi
 Critics' Week Audience Award: Là-bas by Guido Lombardi

Venice Days (Giornati degli Autori)
 Label Europa Cinemas Award: Guilty (Présumé coupable) by Vincent Garenq
 Lina Mangiacapre Award: Shun Li and the Poet (Io sono Li) by Andrea Segre
 Laterna Magica Award: Shun Li and the Poet by Andrea Segre
 FEDIC Award: Shun Li and the Poet by Andrea Segre

Other collateral awards
The following collateral awards were conferred to films of the official selection:
 FIPRESCI Award:
Best Film (Main competition): Shame by Steve McQueen
Best Film (Horizons): Two Years at Sea by Ben Rivers
 SIGNIS Award: Faust by Alexander Sokurov
Special mention: A Simple Life (Tao jie) by Ann Hui
 Francesco Pasinetti Award (SNGCI):
Best Film: Terraferma by Emanuele Crialese
Best Debut (or Special mention): The Last Man on Earth by Gian Alfonso Pacinotti
 Cicae Prize: The Orator (O le tulafale) by Tusi Tamasese (Horizons)
 Leoncino d'oro Agiscuola Award: Carnage by Roman Polanski
Cinema for UNICEF Award: Terraferma by Emanuele Crialese
 C.I.C.T. UNESCO Enrico Fulchignoni Award: Tahrir 2011: The Good, the Bad, and the Politician by Tamer Ezzat, Ahmad Abdalla, Ayten Amin, Amr Salama (Out of competition)
 Nazareno Taddei Award: A Simple Life by Ann Hui
 CinemAvvenire Award – Best Film: Shame by Steve McQueen
Best Film – Il cerchio non è rotondo Award: The Orator by Tusi Tamasese
 Equal Opportunity Award: A Simple Life by Ann Hui
 Future Film Festival Digital Award: Faust by Alexander Sokurov
Special mention: Kotoko by Shinya Tsukamoto
 Gianni Astrei Award: A Simple Life by Ann Hui
 Brian Award: The Ides of March by George Clooney
 Queer Lion Award: Wilde Salomé by Al Pacino (Out of competition)
 Lina Mangiacapre Award – Special mention: Maternity Blues by Fabrizio Cattani (Controcampo Italiano)
 AIF Forfilmfest Award: Easy! (Scialla!) by Francesco Bruni (Controcampo Italiano)
 Biografilm Lancia Award: Black Block by Carlo Augusto Bachschmidt (Controcampo Italiano)
 Mimmo Rotella Foundation Award: The Last Man on Earth by Gian Alfonso Pacinotti
Special mention: Pasta nera by Alessandro Piva (Controcampo Italiano)
 Golden Mouse: Killer Joe by William Friedkin
 Premio Open: Marco Müller

References

External links

 
 Venice Film Festival 2011 Awards on IMDb

Venice Film Festival
Venice Film Festival
Venice Film Festival
Venice Film Festival
Film
August 2011 events in Italy
September 2011 events in Italy